The Ukrainian News Agency (Informatsiyne ahentstvo "Ukrayins'ki Novyny") is a Kyiv-based Ukrainian news agency. It produces and provides political, business and financial information, as well as a popular photo reporting service. Since February 2008 the company is part of the Inter Media Group Ltd., formerly U.A. Inter Media Group, which itself is a subsidiary of the Russian-based company GDF Media Ltd. Inter Media Group Limited also owns 61% of the Ukrainian TV channel Inter.

Founded in 1993, by Mykhailo Kolomiets and Volodymyr Hranovskiy the agency now used by about 10,000 clients daily. The agency offers 27 information and analytical products in Russian, Ukrainian and English. Ukrainian News is the only agency in Ukraine that translates 100% of its products into English.

Valery Khoroshkovsky held a 50% stake of Ukrainian News because Mykhailo Kolomiets 50% stake was nominal and the other 50% stake was held by the Agency for Humanitarian Technologies (AHT) which lists Viktor Pinchuk as its owner. Maxim Karizhsky, the general director of AHT, however, stated that Pinchuk is not the owner of AHT. AHT signed an agreement with the United States public relations firm Black, Kelly, Scruggs & Healey (BKSH) for the period of 1 January 2001 to 30 September 2001. Volodymyr Granovsky established Humanitarian Technologies agency.

On 18 November 2002, the body of founder Mykhailo Kolomiets was found dead hanging from a tree near Molodechno, Belarus, after being missing for four weeks. He met with Volodymyr Hranovskiy just before he deleted all files on his computer and left for Minsk on 22 October 2001. On 30 October 2001, his body was found and he was buried two weeks later as unidentified.

In May 2006, the agency opened a modern press conference hall.

The agency has its own building. It is located just outside Palats Sportu subway station in central Kyiv.

Notes

References

External links
  Ukrainian News Agency online (English)
 Ukrainian News Agency online (Ukrainian)

News agencies based in Ukraine
Mass media in Kyiv
Ukrainian brands
1993 establishments in Ukraine